The discography of Hey! Say! JUMP features nine studio albums, twenty-eight singles and forty-one music videos, all released through J Storm. The group activities started when the temporary five-member group Hey! Say! 7 were put together to provide the theme song for the anime Lovely Complex. The original members were Yuya Takaki, Daiki Arioka, Ryosuke Yamada, Yuto Nakajima, Yuri Chinen. The five Hey! Say! 7 members were later joined by another four idols, Kota Yabu, Kei Inoo, Hikaru Yaotome and  Keito Okamoto, thus creating the group Hey! Say! JUMP, the agency's largest group in history. The group made their CD debut through "Ultra Music Power" which topped the Oricon singles chart. Hey! Say! JUMP released their first full length studio album, JUMP No. 1 on July 7, 2010.

Studio albums

Singles

Video albums

Music videos

Notes

References

Discographies of Japanese artists
Pop music group discographies